Khasa may refer to:
 
Khasas, an ancient people of Indian subcontinent
Khasa kingdom, an ancient Kingdom in Western Nepal 
Khas people, an Indo-Aryan ethno-linguistic people of Nepal
Khasas (Mahabharata), an ancient tribe in Hindu literature
Zhangmu (Nepali: Khasa), a town in Nyalam County, Tibet
Khasa River, a tributary of the Tigris on whose banks stands the city of Kirkuk
Khasa (cloth), a type of cotton fabric made in the Mughal Empire